is a Japanese anime series. Directed by Masami Ōbari, the 24 episodes were broadcast on WOWOW between April 4 and September 19, 2000.

Ordian was Masami Obari's second attempt at directing an anime television series, following 1997's 
Virus Buster Serge.

Anime
The series uses three pieces of theme music; one opening theme and two ending themes. "Shinryaku: the Chariots VII" by OZWORLD is the series' opening theme. "Eien no Remake" by Yuumi Kobayashi is the series' first ending theme and "TSUIOKU: Only Eternity" by Miki Takaesu is the series' second ending theme.

Plot
Yū Kananase is just an ordinary high-school student. Since he has mysterious inside knowledge about piloting a mecha, he is recruited by the International Military Organization as a potential test pilot for a new mobile armor. However, apparently other young recruits around his age, including one of his classmates, were recruited as test pilot as well. Now Yū must prove that he is the best to be the test pilot.

External links
 

2000 anime television series debuts
Anime with original screenplays
Mecha anime and manga
Wowow original programming